is the second story arc of the manga series JoJo's Bizarre Adventure written and illustrated by Hirohiko Araki. It was serialized for around  years in Shueisha's Weekly Shōnen Jump from November 2, 1987, to March 27, 1989, for 69 chapters, which were later collected into seven tankōbon volumes. The arc was preceded by Phantom Blood (1987) and followed by Stardust Crusaders (1989–1992).

Set in North America and Europe in 1938–39 around 50 years after Phantom Blood, the story follows Joseph Joestar and Caesar Anthonio Zeppeli, descendants of Jonathan Joestar and Will A. Zeppeli from Phantom Blood who can manipulate sunlight-based energy called Hamon. Along with the Hamon master Lisa Lisa, Joseph and Caesar seek to prevent ancient humanoids called the Pillar Men, who invented the stone masks from Phantom Blood, from obtaining a powerful stone called the Super Aja, which would evolve them into ultimate beings and conquer their vulnerability to sunlight.

In 2012, Battle Tendency was digitally colored and released as digital downloads for smartphones and tablet computers. A four-volume re-release under the title JoJonium was published in 2014. This version was licensed and released in North America by Viz Media in 2015 and 2016.

Battle Tendency was adapted as part of the first season of David Production's 2012 anime television series JoJo's Bizarre Adventure.

Plot 
In the series' backstory, 102,000 years ago in a place that would be modern-day Mexico, it started with a mysterious but powerful race with incredibly long lifespans and the ability to absorb life forces from plants and animals, although they had the disadvantage of being easily disintegrated if exposed to sunlight and thus lived underground instead. Kars, an underground-dwelling humanoid being known as a Pillar Man, created a stone mask which grants immortality by absorbing life energy to conquer the sun (which kills his kind). He slaughtered all but four of the tribe. As the Pillar Men's bodies were already immortal, they required more power for them to become ultimate beings. In 39 AD, three of the Pillar Men, Kars, Wamuu, and Esidisi, came to the Roman Empire to find a perfectly cut  known as the  Kars, Wamuu, and Esidisi developed fighting styles to counter Hamon, an energy with the same properties as the energy from sunlight, and nearly wiped out the Hamon tribe, but the stone narrowly escaped them. Following this, the Pillar Men went into a 2,000-year sleep.

In 1889, Erina Joestar's husband Jonathan was killed by Dio Brando on a ship in the Atlantic Ocean. Erina survived and saved the life of a baby girl, whose parents were killed by the stone mask. The girl, Elizabeth, was raised by the Hamon master Straizo, who taught her to use Hamon and gave her the Super Aja. Elizabeth married Erina's son George and they had a son called Joseph. When Joseph was a baby, George was killed by a zombie that blended in as a commander of the Royal Flying Corps and his death was covered up. Upon killing the zombie in an act of revenge, a warrant for Elizabeth's arrest was sent out. She went into hiding and adopted the alias Lisa Lisa. Joseph was raised by Erina. He inherited Hamon abilities from Jonathan.

At the start of the series, in the fall of 1938, as the World War II looms, Joseph and Erina move from London to New York. Meanwhile, former thug turned oil baron Robert E. O. Speedwagon invites Straizo to Mexico to destroy a sleeping Pillar Man with Hamon. Straizo instead wounds Speedwagon, and uses a stone mask near the Pillar Man and Speedwagon's blood to become an immortal vampire. Straizo goes to New York to destroy Joseph and Erina, believed to be the last people who know about the stone mask. When Joseph defeats Straizo, Straizo tells him that the Pillar Man is about to awaken and he will meet the Pillar Man soon. Straizo then commits suicide by channeling Hamon through himself, destroying his vampire body. Intrigued, Joseph goes to Mexico and is informed that Speedwagon was taken to detention by the Nazis, who also hold the ambition to study the Pillar Men to serve Adolf Hitler's world conquest. Joseph saves Speedwagon, who survived, from the awakened Pillar Man named Santana, and with the help of Rudol von Stroheim, the Nazi Major wounded by Santana, tricks Santana into being turned to stone by the sunlight reflected from a well.

Joseph and Speedwagon travel to Rome, where they meet Caesar Zeppeli, a man who trained in Hamon to continue the legacy of his father Mario and grandfather Will. However, the group arrives too late to prevent Kars, Wamuu, and Esidisi from awakening. Joseph plays on Wamuu's pride and convinces Wamuu to let him live to be a more worthy opponent. Both Wamuu and Esidisi implant poison-filled rings in his aorta and windpipe, giving Joseph 33 days to get the antidotes from each of them.

Joseph and Caesar train in Hamon under Lisa Lisa on Air Suplena Island off the coast of Venice. Esidisi raids the island and is challenged by Joseph. Joseph destroys Esidisi's body and takes his antidote, but Esidisi's brain is able to possess Lisa Lisa's handmaid, Suzi Q, to steal the Super Aja and ship it off to Kars and Wammu. Joseph and Caeser work together to purge Esidisi's influence on Suzi Q and destroy him for good. The group tracks down Kars and Wamuu to Switzerland. Caesar is killed fighting Wamuu one-on-one, and takes the antidote for Joseph before dying. Joseph and Lisa Lisa then confront Kars and Wamuu for the Super Aja, Lisa Lisa bluffing that she has a timed explosive that will destroy the stone. Joseph kills Wamuu in battle.

On February 28, 1939, Kars acquires the Super Aja and uses it along with the stone mask to become the ultimate being, despite efforts by Joseph and his newfound allies von Stroheim to prevent it. Now immune to the sun and able to use Hamon, Kars's only desire is to kill Joseph. Joseph steals a Nazi plane and tries to crash it and Kars into the volcanic island of Vulcano. Joseph and Kars escape, but the shock of the plane crash causes a volcanic eruption. Kars attempts to kill Joseph with Hamon, but Joseph instinctively holds up the Super Aja, which causes the energy to prompt an eruption climax, sending Joseph and Kars flying into the sky on a large rock. Kars is knocked into space by volcanic debris. He tries to return to Earth, but his body freezes over and turns to stone. Unable to perish even though he desperately wants to, he drifts through space for eternity, eventually ceasing to think. Returning to Earth, Joseph is nursed to health by Lisa Lisa's assistant Suzi Q, whom he marries. In the epilogue, set in 1987, an aged Joseph takes a flight from John F. Kennedy International Airport to Japan, where his daughter and grandson live, directly leading in to the first chapters of the following story arc, Stardust Crusaders.

Characters 

  is the main protagonist and grandson of Jonathan Joestar. Like Jonathan, he can use Hamon, though he is not initially as skilled in its use as Jonathan was. He initially uses a pair of Hamon-empowered clackers in battle, but he relies more on his wits than brute strength in fights, employing his uncanny ability to predict his opponent's actions down to what they will say next. Joseph makes return appearances in Stardust Crusaders and Diamond Is Unbreakable.
  is a suave ladies' man and the grandson of Jonathan Joestar's teacher Will A. Zeppeli. He is rather cool and collected, especially compared to Joseph, with whom he is grudgingly paired to fight the Pillar Men. But over time, Joseph starts to grow on him so much that he is able to understand his strange thought patterns and they form an unbeatable duo. He infuses the Hamon into soap bubbles he creates with his specially-made gloves. Caesar dies near the end, in way like his grandfather, giving Joseph the last of his "Hamon" to help him defeat the rest of the pillar men.
  formerly  is a mysterious Hamon master who lives in Venice. She is introduced as Caesar's Hamon teacher and later revealed to be the last surviving master of the Hamon Tribe as well as Joseph's mother. She fights by conducting Hamon through her specially made scarf, that was made with the yarn of the Satiporoja beetle, that can conduct Hamon at 100%.
  is an ordinary pickpocket hailing from New York whose newfound friendship with Joseph Joestar places him at the spectator's seat of the battle against the Pillar Men.
  is an ally of Joseph and an old friend of the Joestars. Since the events of Phantom Blood, Speedwagon has settled in America, where he became an oil tycoon and founded the Speedwagon Foundation in order to deal with paranormal threats such as the Stone Mask and, later, the Pillar Men.
  is the commander of the Nazi forces who discovered Santana in Mexico. He is responsible for not only saving the life of Speedwagon, but also for trying to help Joseph defeat Santana by blowing himself up along with him. He returns later as a cyborg to assist in the fight against Kars and his army. He eventually dies in 1943 during the Battle of Stalingrad.
  is one of the Pillar Men. Like the other Pillar Men, he uses a particular fighting style known as a "Mode".
  is one of the Pillar Men and Kars' loyal servant, following a warrior's code of honor. His  allows him to control the air in his lungs, which he can use to blast his opponents, cut them with extremely fast gusts, or render himself invisible.
  is the main antagonist of Battle Tendency as well as the leader of the Pillar Men and the creator of the stone masks. He uses  which allows him to produce saw-bladed appendages from his body which produce a radiant glow. He is intelligent and ruthless, and single minded in his dedication to become the  Though Kars succeeds, his obsession with killing Joseph leads to his defeat, as he ends up being knocked out of Earth's orbit and frozen in space. Unable to die even though he desperately wants to, he eventually goes brain dead.
Santana is one of the Pillar Men. He was discovered by the Nazis in Mexico. Although he does not have a Mode, he is able to manipulate his body, allowing him to squeeze into tiny spaces and use his ribs as blades. He can also absorb other people into his own body. When awakened, Santana attempted to absorb Joseph Joestar and Stroheim, but he was turned into stone by the sun.

Production 
Because it was "unprecedented" to kill off the main character in a Weekly Shōnen Jump manga in 1987, Hirohiko Araki made the protagonist of Battle Tendency look very similar to Part 1's Jonathan, but with a more adventurous and confrontational personality. Araki called Joseph a swindler in comparison to the gentlemanly Jonathan, because he is constantly looking to win and will do insane things without hesitation. This was not only to create contrast between the two, but also because the author wanted to shift from the physical battles in Part 1 to more "cerebral" fights. He wanted Joseph to be a shōnen manga hero who bends the rules as he fights, like the protagonist of his earlier series Cool Shock B.T., winning by cunning and logic, instead of bravery and perseverance.

Having not been able to show a friendly rivalry between Jonathan and Dio Brando in Part 1, Araki introduced Caesar Zeppeli to present a more positive friendly rivalry between him and Joseph since Weekly Shōnen Jump is a shōnen magazine. Because Joseph and Caesar both inherited the bloodlines of their grandfathers, the author wanted to connect their individual Hamon abilities to their last names. Thus he gave Joseph a "trickster" style, and Caesar the seemingly fleeting-bubbles as a "representation of his fate and the burden he is carrying." Having never been a fan of the main character receiving some unbeatable ability, Araki enjoys giving characters weapons with faults and having them make up for it with strategy. He noted that the spherical shape of the bubbles allowed him to morph them into discs or use them as lenses. The author also stated that these "spheres" were inherited by both Gyro Zeppeli in Steel Ball Run and Josuke Higashikata in JoJolion.

Araki stated that at the time, female characters in shōnen manga were typically cute and designed to be "a man's ideal woman." He said readers were not interested in realistic portrayals of women, but rather the type of girl "that giggles during a conversation" with heart marks next to her. He believes this made the warrior-type Lisa Lisa feel fresh and "unheard of" in both manga and society in general and said it was exciting to challenge people's expectations with her. Araki also said that the supernatural basis of the fights in his series evened the battlefield for women and children to match up against strong men. This idea that looks are irrelevant in supernatural battles led to the introduction of Stands in Stardust Crusaders. Because the Hamon master in Part 1, Will A. Zeppeli, was very gentle, he wanted to give Lisa Lisa a "sadistic" personality. The author based her on a smart and intimidating neighborhood girl who tutored him in elementary school. He stated that at the time it was hard to get Japanese readers to remember a foreign name, so he chose something with repetition. He also said that Lisa Lisa phonetically resembles Japanese to an extent.

Needing the Pillar Men to surpass Dio, Araki said he had to up the ante to the level of gods, and so based their designs on Roman statues, Egyptian sphinxes and Japanese nio statues to give them godlike features. Araki designed Kars with a turban to show his superior intelligence and that he is their king. He said that if you compared the Pillar Men to Mito Kōmon, Kars would be Kōmon, Esidisi would be Suke-san, and Wamuu would be Kaku-san. Kars' ability Brilliant Bone Blade is a "Light Mode" because Araki thought a shining blade would be a godlike technique and would visually express that defeating him was impossible. He speculated that many readers were probably reminded of the similar Reskiniharden Saber Phenomenon technique from his series Baoh, and admitted that aspects of Kars' goal to become the ultimate being somewhat overlapped with the earlier work. Visually speaking, Araki also really enjoys drawing flesh and blade merge as something that is only possible in manga.

Chapters 
The original volumization and Shueisha's 2002 re-release use different chapter titles. In the original volumization, chapters 45–47 are collected in volume 5, listed on the Phantom Blood page.

Original volumization

2002 release

2012 release

2014 release / English release

Related media 

Ōtarō Maijō's 2012 novel Jorge Joestar, follows the titular character, the father of Joseph Joestar, and his story as a child in the Canary Islands and pilot in the Royal Air Force, as well as an alternate version who lives in Japan and is investigating strange events regarding alternate dimensions.

The arc was adapted as part of the first season of David Production's anime television adaptation, airing between December 7, 2012, and April 5, 2013. Warner Bros. Entertainment released this series in English on July 28, 2015.

The young Joseph of this series appears as a playable character, alongside his older self, in Capcom's 1998 arcade fighting game, JoJo's Bizarre Adventure. Joseph, Caesar, Wamuu, Esidisi and Kars appear as playable characters in Bandai Namco Games' 2013 fighting game, JoJo's Bizarre Adventure: All-Star Battle, with Lisa Lisa later appearing as a downloadable character. Joseph, Caesar, Stroheim, Lisa Lisa, Wamuu, Esidisi, and Kars also appear in JoJo's Bizarre Adventure: Eyes of Heaven, also by Bandai Namco.

Reception
Anime News Network's Rebecca Silverman described Battle Tendency as "less urgent" than Part 1, which allows for more humor and insanity, while still letting the reader get attached to the characters. She felt positively about how strikingly different the protagonist Joseph is from Part 1's Jonathan. However, she wrote that Araki's art had gotten even more "physically improbable," making it difficult to distinguish body parts. When discussing his views on having characters die in a series, writer Gen Urobuchi cited Battle Tendencys Caesar Zeppeli as a character who became "immortal" thanks to his death.

Notes

References 

Adventure anime and manga
Comics set in Rome
Fantasy anime and manga
Fiction set in 1938
Fiction set in 1939
JoJo's Bizarre Adventure
Nazis in fiction
New York (state) in fiction
Shueisha manga
Shōnen manga
Supernatural anime and manga
Switzerland in fiction
Viz Media manga